Iguatemi is a municipality in the Brazilian state of Mato Grosso do Sul.

Iguatemi may also refer to:
 Iguatemi (district of São Paulo)
 Iguatemi São Paulo, a shopping centre in São Paulo